Teste de Fidelidade was a Brazilian television talk show, aired by RedeTV! on Sunday nights between March 2, 2013 and May 31, 2015.

Usually two couples have a spouse tested by actors and / or actresses, if the spouse may or may not be accused of infidelity to the other spouse. The spouse of the person tested always sees all the scenes. The show almost always end up in physical fights on the stage between the spouse who requested the test and the spouse tested (using the censor beep), until the spouses will be separated by studio security.

Seducers

References

RedeTV! original programming
2013 Brazilian television series debuts
2015 Brazilian television series endings